The Bacolod North Road is a , two-to-six lane major north–south lateral highway that connects the city of Bacolod to the city of San Carlos in Negros Occidental, Philippines.

The road is a component of National Route 7 (N7) of the Philippine highway network.

Route Description

Assigned 
This road is assigned as N7 by the DPWH.

Intersections

References

External links 
 Department of Public Works and Highways

Roads in Negros Occidental